Dr Anae Neru Asi Tuiataga Leavasa is a New Zealand politician. He was elected as a Member of Parliament in the House of Representatives for the Labour Party in 2020.

Early life and family
Leavasa's parents immigrated from Samoa in the 1980s. His mother is from Le'auva'a and Solosolo and his father is from Vaiala and Vaimoso. He was born in Auckland and has four brothers and an older sister. His mother's uncle was Minister of Education in Samoa and his paternal grandfather was Minister of Agriculture in Samoa. Tuimalealiʻifano Vaʻaletoʻa Sualauvi II, the O le Ao o le Malo (head of state of Samoa), is also an uncle. 

Leavasa received secondary education at Marcellin College and Auckland Grammar School. As a teenager, Leavasa survived metastatic bone cancer. He has only one lung and has a metal joint in one knee, and walks with a slight limp.

He earned his medical degree from the University of Auckland Medical School and was awarded fellowship of the Royal New Zealand College of General Practitioners in 2014. Prior to entering Parliament, Leavasa worked for 12 years as a general practitioner and sports doctor in Māngere.

He is married and has one child.

Political career

Leavasa was elected to the Māngere-Ōtāhuhu Local Board in the 2019 elections.

At the  Leavasa stood for parliament for the Labour Party and was ranked 52nd on the party list. He also ran for the Takanini electorate which he won by a margin of 7,724 votes. This was the first election after Takanini had been created and many, including University of Auckland political scientist Lara Greaves, had anticipated prior to the election that the seat would be won by National.

Political views
Dr Leavasa depicts himself as a social conservative with a Christian faith background. He opposed the 2020 decriminalisation of abortion, saying: "I come from a faith background, and so I won't move on my moral convictions. In regards to the abortion legislation, I would have, from a faith background and a conservative view, have voted against it."

Leavasa wants the government to build more housing to accommodate Takanini's growing population and to also reduce the health risks from overcrowding.

References

1980s births
Living people
New Zealand Labour Party MPs
Members of the New Zealand House of Representatives
New Zealand list MPs
21st-century New Zealand politicians
New Zealand Christians
People from Māngere